Cedar Pass is a gap between Tippett Canyon and Pleasant Valley in White Pine County, Nevada. These valleys divide the South Mountains from the Kern Mountains.

References 

Landforms of White Pine County, Nevada